Magarhai is a village in Chitrakoot, Uttar Pradesh, India.

References

Villages in Chitrakoot district